Regina Palkovits (born 1980) is a German chemist who is a Professor of Chemistry at the RWTH Aachen University. Her research considers heterogenous catalysis. She was elected a Fellow of the North Rhine-Westphalian Academy of Sciences, Humanities and the Arts in 2020.

Early life and education 
Palkovits studied chemical engineering at the Technical University of Dortmund. She spent a year at Lehigh University as a visiting student working in chemical engineering. She joined the Max Planck Institute for Coal Research for her doctoral research, where she studied the use of mesoporous silica in heterogeneous catalysis. She joined Utrecht University as a postdoctoral scholar working in the group of Bert Weckhuysen.

Research and career 
In 2008, Palkovits returned to the Max Planck Institute as a group leader. She spent two years in Mülheim before joining RWTH Aachen University as a Professor of Chemistry. Palkovits has continued to investigate heterogeneous catalysis, looking at how to transform renewable resources into high value products. Palkovits has investigated how biomass, carbon dioxide and plastic waste can be converted into monomers for polymer synthesis and the production of carbon dioxide neutral fuels.

Academic service 
Palkovits leads the Sustainable Chemistry Division of the German Chemical Society. She was a founding member of AcademiaNet, a network established to address the underrepresentation of women in senior positions in science. In 2011, Palkovits' commitment to increasing diversity in science was recognised when she was selected as one of Germany's 100 Women of Tomorrow.

Awards and honours 
 2006 Royal Netherlands Academy of Arts and Sciences Hendrik Casimir – Karl Ziegler Research Award 
 2010 North Rhine-Westphalia Innovation Prize
 2010 GKSS-Prize Science for the Public
 2010 Jochen Block-Preis
 2014 National Academy of Engineering Frontiers of Engineering
 2017 DECHEMA Award
 2019 European Federation of Catalysis Societies Young Researcher award
 2019 Max Planck Institute for Chemical Energy Conversion Max Planck Fellow
 2020 Elected Fellow of the North Rhine-Westphalian Academy of Sciences, Humanities and the Arts

Selected publications

References

External links
 

1980 births
Living people
Technical University of Dortmund alumni
Academic staff of RWTH Aachen University
21st-century German chemists
German women chemists
21st-century German women